Plectranthus purpuratus, called purple Swedish ivy and Vick's plant, is a species of flowering plant in the family Lamiaceae, native to South Africa and eSwatini. It has gained the Royal Horticultural Society's Award of Garden Merit.

Subtaxa
The following subspecies are accepted:
Plectranthus purpuratus subsp. montanus van Jaarsv. & T.J.Edwards – Northern Provinces, Eswatini
Plectranthus purpuratus subsp. purpuratus – KwaZulu-Natal
Plectranthus purpuratus subsp. tongaensis van Jaarsv. & T.J.Edwards – KwaZulu-Natal

References

purpuratus
Flora of KwaZulu-Natal
Flora of the Northern Provinces
Flora of Swaziland
Plants described in 1860